A Beautiful World is the debut studio album by American singer-songwriter Robin Thicke. Originally released on October 15, 2002, the album went under the name Cherry Blue Skies but was later renamed. On April 15, 2003; the album was reissued and features the extra tracks "A Beautiful World" and "She's Gangsta". The woman featured on the cover of the album is Paula Patton, who was Thicke's then-girlfriend and his future ex-wife.

Background
Speaking of the album's creation process, Thicke told Billboard “I had no idea what I was doing while I was doing it. I just made decisions based on what sounds good and feels good. If something started with a rock-guitar sound and it was a good riff, I would just keep going with it. If it was a hip-hop drum beat, I'd work with it."
Reflecting on the album in 2008, Thicke described it as an “expression and the limitless possibilities of music" and said, "I just tried to do anything and everything on it.”

Chart performance
The album managed to reach at number 152 on the US Billboard 200 chart, while it peaked at number 4 on the Billboard's Top Heatseekers album chart. As of January 2012, the album has sold 119,000 copies in the United States.

Track listing
All tracks produced by Robin Thicke and Pro Jay.

Personnel
Credits adapted from liner notes and Allmusic.

 Robin Thicke — piano
 Sean Hurley — bass
 Bobby Keyes — guitar
 Pro J — drums, piano, mixing
 Harry King — piano
 Larry Cox — piano
 Dino Meneghin — guitar
 Herman Matthews — drums

 Raphael Padilla — percussion
 Bill Meyers — orchestral arrangements
 Randy Waldman — horn arrangements
 Bill Malina — recording, editing, mixing
 Jean—Marie Horvat — mixing
 Andre Harrell — executive producer
 Drew Fitzgerald — art direction
 Sante D'Orazio — art direction, photography

Charts

References

Robin Thicke albums
Albums produced by Robin Thicke
2003 debut albums